Ladislav Dluhoš (born October 6, 1965 in Čeladná) is a Czechoslovakian/Czech former ski jumper who competed from 1984 to 1995. He earned two bronze medals in the Team large hill event at the FIS Nordic World Ski Championships (1984, 1989), and earned his best individual finish of 6th in the individual large hill in 1989.

Dluhoš's best finish at the Winter Olympics was 4th in the team large hill at Calgary in 1988. He also finished 4th in the 1986 Ski-flying World Championships.

Dluhoš's best individual career finish was 2nd three times (1985, 1986, 1990).

External links 

1965 births
Living people
Czechoslovak male ski jumpers
Czech male ski jumpers
Ski jumpers at the 1984 Winter Olympics
Ski jumpers at the 1988 Winter Olympics
Ski jumpers at the 1994 Winter Olympics
Olympic ski jumpers of Czechoslovakia
Olympic ski jumpers of the Czech Republic
FIS Nordic World Ski Championships medalists in ski jumping